Jellel Gasteli (born in Tunis in 1958) is a French-Tunisian photographer. He is best known for his minimalistic "White Series" (La Série Blanche), which captures the geometry of light and shadow on traditional white-washed Tunisian buildings. Having lived many years in Paris, Gasteli is currently residing in Tunis.

Gasteli's work was included in the exhibition Africa Remix at the Mori Art Museum.

References

1958 births
Living people
Tunisian photographers